Zeppelin University (German: Zeppelin Universität, ZU) is a small and highly selective private research university on the shores of Lake Constance in Friedrichshafen, Germany. The university is accredited by the Ministry of Science, Research and the Arts of Baden-Württemberg and belongs among the best universities in Germany. The university was established in 2003 and is known for its avant-garde character as well as for its sophisticated method of selecting students. It is named after the German general and airship constructor Ferdinand Graf von Zeppelin, whose foundation is a prominent financier of the university.

Campus 

Zeppelin University has two campuses in Friedrichshafen: the LakeCampus at the shores of Lake Constance, and the nearby ZF Campus, which was completed in 2015. The ZF Campus was funded by a donation of 20 million Euro from ZF Friedrichshafen. Both campuses are modern, designed by well-known architects, and contain classrooms, lecture halls, offices, cafeterias, a library, a fitness studio and a co-working wing for students.

In 2018 the ZF Campus was named one of four new exceptional constructions in Germany by the German Architecture Museum. The university was also awarded with the "Deutscher Hochschulbaupreis 2018" by the Deutsche Universitätsstiftung.

Rankings 
Zeppelin University is a small and exclusive private university and offers fewer programs than traditional universities in Germany. Because it is relatively new and small, it typically goes unranked in international comparisons.

In the most reputable German ranking, the CHE, the Zeppelin University achieved the best result of all German universities in the political science/social sciences for its teaching offerings and general study situation in 2021/22.

In the previous year, the bachelor's and master's degree programs of the ZU in economics ranked first among all German universities in the CHE ranking, together with Johann Wolfgang Goethe University Frankfurt am Main.

In the CHE Ranking 2018/2019, the Bachelor's and Master's programs of the ZU in Politics, Administration & International Relations were among the best-ranked in Germany.

In the CHE Ranking 2017/2018, ZU was ranked among the top 3 German universities for the Bachelor's and Master's programs in Economics.

In 2015/2016, the Center for Higher Education Development ranked Zeppelin University's Master's program in Political Science as the third-best among all German universities.

In the CHE Ranking 2014/15, the ZU's bachelor's degree programs in Economics, Cultural and Communication Studies, and Political and Administrative Science occupied positions in the top group among German universities. The ranking particularly lauds the supervision ratio, study situation, subject selection, and students' intellectual freedom.

In 2014/15 CHE Master's University Ranking, Zeppelin University's Master's program in Economics and Johannes Gutenberg University Mainz formed the top group among Germany's universities.

In the Handelsblatt Karriere magazine, in edition 07/08 dated 27 April 2007, Zeppelin University appeared in a university ranking for the first time. Its economics program reached eighth place in the german-speaking area back then.

Academic profile
The university offers 16 Bachelor's and Master's tracks, including executive Master's education. Students can graduate with the academic degree of Bachelor of Arts and a consecutive or non-consecutive Master of Arts or Master of Science.

Zeppelin University only offers four years undergraduate study programs. One year is intended to be used as a "Humboldt year", a one-year research project at a partner university. To enable this, the university's academic calendar closely mirrors international academic calendars.

Partner universities 
Zeppelin University has partnerships with around 85 universities, some of which are:

University of California, Berkeley
Sciences Po
Copenhagen Business School
University of Twente
Goldsmiths College
Maastricht University

Tuition fees and scholarships 
Tuition for undergraduate programs in the nominal study period of four years cost between 36,720 to 42,000 euro. For postgraduate programs, the tuition costs between 13,320 and 23,160 euros for the two-year program.

Students not in receipt of a scholarship are offered low-interest loans by Sparkasse Bodensee. More than two-thirds of students avail of such loans. Alternatively, students can apply for grants from ZU-Bildungsfonds.

Selection process 
Applicants are selected by the university in a two-step selection process: after a detailed written application, in which the first round of selection is made, candidates are invited to an assessment day (Pioneers Wanted). Candidates go through several interviews with professors, students, alumni, and external reviewers. Written tests are also featured. Candidates have to complete a group project which is presented to the assessment committee.

The university's selection procedure is considered sophisticated, and not just because its methods differ from those of other universities. It does not just use numerus clausus (which is widely used in Germany), but instead tries to find students who—beyond having the required academic qualifications— also fit the university's character. The university's undergraduate acceptance rate is lower than 10%, and its graduate acceptance rate is about 16%.

Engagement and student projects 
There are some 59 student groups and projects, such as groups affiliated with political parties (LHG, Jusos, RCDS), a debating club (Soapbox), the Club of International Politics (CIP), a Model United Nations group (MUN), which also organizes LakeMun, entrepreneurial groups, a cultural club which also organizes a music festival at the university (SeeKult), a student medical service (ZUFA), a film group, several bands and many more – some of them are even known nationally (RockYourLife, for example). A student radio station Welle20 went on air in 2008. In the last few years new initiatives have emerged for example the "ZUtaten" career fair, or the student consulting group "Whyknot". There is also an ERASMUS group named "International Student Group" and the "Hochschulsport" club which organises several sport activities such as volleyball, cheerleading, lacrosse, rowing, etc.

Research institutes 
The Zeppelin University has various integrated interdisciplinary research institutes, which are partly funded by donations. These include the Leadership Excellence Institute Zeppelin (LEIZ), which is supported by the Karl Schlecht Stiftung, the Friedrichshafener Institut für Familienunternehmen (Institute for family business), the Forschungszentrum für Verbraucher, Markt und Politik (a research institute for consumers, markets and politics), and the European Center for Sustainability Research supported by Audi and Rolls-Royce Power Systems.

References

External links 

 

2003 establishments in Germany
Educational institutions established in 2003
Friedrichshafen
Political science education
Public administration
Public policy schools
Schools of international relations
Universities and colleges in Baden-Württemberg